Major-General Justice Crosland Tilly DSO MC (27 January 1888 – 5 January 1941) was a British Army officer who commanded the 2nd Armoured Division during the early stages of the Second World War.

Military career
Tilly was commissioned into the Leicestershire Regiment (later the Royal Leicestershire Regiment) in 1907. He served in East Africa before fighting in the First World War. He served on the North West Frontier of India in 1924 before becoming Chief Instructor at the Royal Tank Corps Central School in Bovington in 1935 and then Chief Instructor of the Gunnery Wing at the Armoured Fighting Vehicles School in 1937. He went on to be Commander of 1st Tank Brigade in 1938 and then served in the Second World War as General Officer Commanding 2nd Armoured Division from May 1940 before he died in January 1941.

References

Bibliography

External links
Generals of World War II
Lives of the First World War

1888 births
1941 deaths
British Army generals of World War II
Royal Leicestershire Regiment officers
Companions of the Distinguished Service Order
Recipients of the Military Cross
British Army personnel of World War I
British Army personnel killed in World War II
British Army major generals
Military personnel from Bedford